Return to the 36 Chambers: The Dirty Version is the solo debut album of American rapper and Wu-Tang Clan member Ol' Dirty Bastard, released March 28, 1995, on Elektra Records in the United States.

Background
It was the second solo album, after Method Man's Tical to be released from the nine-member Wu-Tang Clan following the release of their debut album. Return to the 36 Chambers was primarily produced by RZA, with additional production from Ol' Dirty Bastard, and affiliates True Master and 4th Disciple. The album features guest appearances from Wu-Tang Clan members GZA, RZA, Method Man, Raekwon, Ghostface Killah and Masta Killa as well as Wu-Tang Killa Beez.

Return to the 36 Chambers: The Dirty Version peaked at number seven on the Billboard 200 and number two on the Top R&B/Hip-Hop Albums chart. The album sold 81,000 copies in its first week, and was certified Platinum in sales by the Recording Industry Association of America (RIAA) on March 26, 2019. Upon its release, the album received positive reviews from most music critics, with many complimenting Ol' Dirty Bastard's bizarre lyrical delivery and RZA's eerie production. The album was nominated for Best Rap Album at the 1996 Grammy Awards.

Critical reception 

Upon its release, Return to the 36 Chambers received general acclaim, including award nominations and inclusions on year-end publications. The Dirty Version was nominated for the 1996 Grammy Award for Best Rap Album, but lost to Naughty by Nature's Poverty's Paradise. In a 4-star review in 1999, Rolling Stone commented, "With his raspy, lisp-punctuated voice and half-sung, half-rapped style, Ol' Dirty Bastard may well be the most original vocalist in hip-hop history." In 1998, the album was selected as one of The Source'''s 100 Best Rap Albums. Entertainment Weekly said that the album showed the "raw, innovative talent of their illest member ... The RZA's signature dissonant piano loops [sparkle] behind Dirty's delirious, reverberating delivery." Melody Maker said, "... an hour of cruel hard and frighteningly funny hip hop; the perfect companion piece to Wu-Tang's 36 Chambers ... the songs are driven by a vicious, unstable urgency."

By contrast, Select gave the album a negative review of two out of five. The review found the album inferior to Method Man's album Tical'', stating that "From the extremely long and unfunny – intro skit, it's obvious ideas are spread wafer thin across the 15 tracks."

Retrospectively, the album has continually seen positive coverage. Pitchfork gave a 9.3/10 to the album in a classic review, lauding it as "a work of orchestrated negligence and a makeshift classic."

Track listing 
Track listing information is taken from the official liner notes and AllMusic.

Personnel

Musicians 
 Ol' Dirty Bastard – assistant engineer, mixing, producer, vocals
 RZA – producer, mixing, vocals
 Ghostface Killah, GZA, Masta Killa, Method Man, Raekwon, Killah Priest, Sunz Of Man, Brooklyn Zu – vocals
 Buddha Monk – vocals, mixing
 Big Dore – producer vocals

Additional 
 Big Dore – producer
 True Master – producer
 Ethan Ryman – producer, engineer
 John Wydrycs, Tim Latham – engineer, mixing
 Jimmie Lee, Jack Hersca – engineer, assistant engineer
 Deden Sumandani – mixing
 Martin Czembor – assistant engineer, mixing
 David Sealy, Jay Nicholas – assistant engineer
 Alli – art direction
 Danny Clinch – photography

Charts

Weekly charts

Year-end charts

Certifications

Accolades 
 The information regarding accolades is adapted from acclaimedmusic.net
 (*) signifies unordered lists

References

External links 
 Return To The 36 Chambers: The Dirty Version at Discogs

Ol' Dirty Bastard albums
1995 debut albums
Elektra Records albums
Albums produced by RZA
Albums produced by True Master
Albums produced by 4th Disciple
Wu-Tang Clan